Kent D. Juhnke (born January 15, 1955) is an American former politician. He served in the South Dakota Senate from 2011 to 2012 and in the House from 1999 to 2004 and 2007 to 2011.

References

1955 births
Living people
People from Pierre, South Dakota
South Dakota State University alumni
Ranchers from South Dakota
Republican Party members of the South Dakota House of Representatives
Republican Party South Dakota state senators
20th-century American politicians
21st-century American politicians
People from Lyman County, South Dakota